The Ultimate Escape is the first full-length album by Tsunami Bomb, released in 2002. "Take the Reins" was the first single from the album. It also has enhanced CD-ROM features including a live video of the band playing their song "No Good Very Bad Day". The album also spawned the first featured video of the band for the single "Take the Reins".

Track listing
 "Take the Reins" – 3:05
 "Russian Roulette" – 2:32
 "Say It If You Mean It" – 3:20
 "Roundabout" – 3:04
 "Top 40 Hit" – 2:22
 "20 Going On..." – 4:05
 "The Simple Truth" – 3:59
 "Headlights on a Handgrenade" – 3:10
 "Count Me Out" – 0:49
 "El Diablo" – 3:05
 "In This Together" – 3:12
 "Swimming Through Molasses" – 4:22

References

Tsunami Bomb albums
2002 albums